This is a summary of 2000 in music in the United Kingdom.

Events
1 January - British composer John Tavener is knighted in the New Year's Honours List.
11 January
Gary Glitter is released from jail, two months before his sentence for sexual offences ends.
Sharon Osbourne quits as manager of Smashing Pumpkins after only three months. In a brash press release she announces she had to resign "for medical reasons: Billy Corgan was making me sick."
16 February – The Silver Tassie, an opera by Mark-Anthony Turnage, receives its première at the London Coliseum, performed by the English National Opera.
24 February – Italian motorcycle manufacturing company Aprilia wins a lawsuit filed against the Spice Girls over a sponsorship deal that fell apart when Geri Halliwell left the group.
28 March – Jimmy Page wins a lawsuit filed against Ministry magazine, which claimed that Page had contributed to the death of Led Zeppelin drummer John Bonham by wearing a Satanic robe and chanting spells while Bonham was dying. The magazine apologizes and offers to pay Page's legal bills. Page donates the money received from the case to the Action for Brazil's Children Trust.
4 April – Mick Jagger attends the opening of an arts center named after him at Dartford Grammar School in southeast England.
5 May – Rod Stewart undergoes an hour-long throat operation at Cedars-Sinai Medical Center in Los Angeles to remove a growth on his thyroid, which turns out to be benign.
13 May - The 45th Eurovision Song Contest final is held in Stockholm's Globe Arena.  The UK entry, "Don't Play That Song Again", performed by Nicki French, finished in sixteenth place - the worst-ever showing for a UK entry up to that time.
21-22 July – Oasis plays at Wembley Stadium. The first of this night is featured on the double CD and the DVD Familiar to Millions.
18 December – Singer-songwriter Kirsty McColl is killed in a speedboat accident while on holiday in Mexico. She was 41.
22 December - Madonna marries film director Guy Ritchie, at Skibo Castle in Dornoch, Sutherland, Scotland with Gwyneth Paltrow, Stella McCartney, Sting, George Clooney, Jon Bon Jovi, Celine Dion, Bryan Adams, Rupert Everett and others in attendance.

Classical music

New works
Thomas Adès – Piano Quintet, op. 20
Julian Anderson – Alhambra Suite, for chamber orchestra
Edward Cowie
Bad Lands Gold, for tuba and piano
Concerto for oboe and orchestra
Dark Matter, for brass ensemble
Elysium IV, for orchestra
Four Frames in a Row, for high voice and baroque ensemble
The Healing of Saul, for violin and harp (or piano)
Several Charms, for violin and piano
Peter Maxwell Davies
Symphony No. 7
Symphony No. 8 Antarctica
James MacMillan – Mass, for choir and organ
Roger Smalley – String Quartet No. 2
John Tavener – Song of the Cosmos

Opera
Peter Maxwell Davies – Mr Emmet Takes a Walk
Jake Heggie – Dead Man Walking
Michael Nyman – Facing Goya
Richard Thomas – Tourette's Diva

Albums
Peter Donohoe - Walton with Maggini String Quartet
Simon Keenlyside - The Songs of Robert Schumann, Vol. 02
Nigel Kennedy - Kennedy Plays Bach

Film and TV scores and incidental music

Film
Charlie Mole - Paranoid
John Murphy - Snatch 
Rachel Portman - Chocolat
Stephen Warbeck 
Billy Elliot
Quills

Television
Richard Rodney Bennett - Gormenghast (nominated for Ivor Novello Awards)
Simon Brint with Kenny G - Monarch of the Glen

Musical films
Love's Labour's Lost, directed by and starring Kenneth Branagh, music by Patrick Doyle

Music awards

BRIT Awards
The 2000 BRIT Awards winners were:

Best selling live act: Steps
Best soundtrack: "Notting Hill"
British album: Travis – "The Man Who"
British breakthrough act: S Club 7
British dance act: The Chemical Brothers
British female solo artist: Beth Orton
British group: Travis
British male solo artist: Tom Jones
British single: Robbie Williams – "She's the One"
British video: Robbie Williams – "She's the One"
International breakthrough act: Macy Gray
International female: Macy Gray
International group: TLC
International male: Beck
Outstanding contribution: Spice Girls
Pop act: Five

Mercury Music Prize
The 2000 Mercury Music Prize was awarded to Badly Drawn Boy – The Hour of Bewilderbeast.

Record of the Year
The Record of the Year was awarded to "My Love" by Westlife

Births
3 June – Beabadoobee, singer-songwriter
9 August – Arlo Parks, singer and poet

Deaths
17 March – Cab Kaye, jazz singer and pianist, 78
27 March – Ian Dury, rock musician, 57 (liver cancer)
7 February – Dave Peverett, singer and guitarist of Foghat, 56 (cancer)
13 April – Inglis Gundry, composer, novelist and musicologist, 94
2 May – Billy Munn, jazz pianist, 88
6 May – Leonard Salzedo, conductor and composer, 78
1 June – Eric Gilder, pianist, conductor, composer and musicologist, 88
15 July – Paul Young, singer and percussionist of Sad Café and Mike + The Mechanics, 53 (heart attack)
21 July – Iain Hamilton, composer, 78
20 August – Nancy Evans, operatic mezzo-soprano, 85
22 October – Fred Pratt Green, Methodist minister and hymnwriter, 97
3 November – Robert Sherlaw Johnson, pianist, composer and music writer, 68
8 November – Dick Morrissey, tenor saxophonist, 60 (cancer)
16 November – Russ Conway, pianist, 75
18 December – Kirsty McColl, singer-songwriter, 41 (speedboat accident)
23 December – Jimmy Shand, accordionist ("The Bluebell Polka"), 92
24 December – Allan Smethurst ("The Singing Postman"), 73

See also
2000 in British music charts
2000 in British radio
2000 in British television
2000 in the United Kingdom
List of British films of 2000

References

 
British music by year